Gerard Clifford (24 June 1941 – 12 December 2016) was a Roman Catholic auxiliary bishop of the Archdiocese of Armagh, Northern Ireland. He was born in Lordship, County Louth. He was educated at Bellurgan National School, Bush Vocational School, St Mary's College, Dundalk, and Saint Patrick’s College, Armagh.  He studied for the priesthood at St. Patrick’s College, Maynooth and undertook postgraduate studies both in Maynooth and in the Jesuit Lumen Vitae, Brussels.

Clifford was ordained a priest on 18 June 1967 for the diocese and was appointed an auxiliary bishop of Armagh and Titular Bishop of Hieron on 25 March 1991. His episcopal consecration took place on 21 April 1991. The Principal Consecrator was Cardinal Daly; his Principal Co-Consecrators were Archbishop Emanuele Gerada, the Apostolic Nuncio to Ireland, and Francis Joseph MacKiernan, Bishop of Kilmore.

References

1941 births
2016 deaths
People from County Louth
20th-century Roman Catholic bishops in Ireland
21st-century Roman Catholic bishops in Ireland
20th-century Roman Catholic titular bishops
Alumni of St Patrick's College, Maynooth